Cyperus latzii is a sedge of the family Cyperaceae that is native to Australia, and found in the Northern Territory and Western Australia.

It blooms between June and July and produces green-yellow-brown flowers.

In Western Australia it is found in swamps and along creeks in the Kimberley region where it grows in sandy-loamy soils.

The species was first described in 1991 by Karen Wilson. There are no synonyms.

See also
List of Cyperus species

References

External links 

 Cyperus latzii occurrence data from Australasian Virtual Herbarium

Plants described in 1991
Flora of Western Australia
latzii